β-Zeacarotene is a carotenoid. It is used as a coloring agent in the food and pharmaceutical industries. First reported in 1953, it was discovered to occur in small quantities when the fungus Phycomyces blakeseeanus was grown with diphenylamine, a compound that inhibits the synthesis of beta-carotene.

References

Carotenoids
Cyclohexenes